Hundsheim is a town in the district of Bruck an der Leitha in Lower Austria, in northeast Austria.

Geography
Hundsheim lies in the industrial area of Lower Austria, but it is largely agrarian. It lies at the foot of the Hundsheimer Mountain (480 m). About 28 percent of the municipality is forested.

References 

Cities and towns in Bruck an der Leitha District